Social Lion is a 1954 Walt Disney-produced animated short film directed by Jack Kinney. The short was released by  Buena Vista  on October 15, 1954. The film was written by Milt Schaffer and Dick Kinney and animated by Norman Ferguson.

Synopsis 
A safari captures a lion in Africa. However, the lion's cage falls off the boat once it arrives in the US. The lion gets out of the cage but fails to intimidate anyone, even several people interact with it in places such as a bus or a bar. In the end, the lion is captured by a group of policemen and taken to a zoo.

Cast 
  
 Stan Freberg - Lion (uncredited)
 Paul Frees - Lions Club President / Drunkards / Clothing Salesman (voice) (uncredited)
 James MacDonald - Lion (roaring) (voice) (uncredited)

Home media
The DVD  "Disney Rarities: Celebrated Shorts: 1920s–1960s" featured  this  short.

References

1954 animated films
1950s Disney animated short films
Films directed by Jack Kinney
Films produced by Walt Disney
Films scored by Oliver Wallace
1950s English-language films